Ferdinand Geminian Wanker (2 October 1758, Freiburg im Breisgau - 19 January 1824, Freiburg im Breisgau) was a German Roman Catholic moral theologian.

Life

Works 
 Christliche Sittenlehre oder Unterricht vom Verhalten des Christen, um durch Tugend wahrhaft glücklich zu werden. 2 Bände. 1794.
 Band 1. Vierte Ausgabe. 1824.
 Band 2. Dritte Ausgabe. 1811.
 Vorlesungen über Religion nach Vernunft und Offenbarung. Für Akademiker und gebildete Christen. 1828 
 Gesammelte Schriften. 4 Bände. 1830.

Bibliography 
 Digitalised works by Wanker - Universitätsbibliothek Freiburg
 Allgemeine deutsche Real-Encyklopädie für die gebildeten Stände. 7. Auflage, F. A. Brockhaus, Leipzig 1827, 12. Bd., S. 65 (Online)
 Heinrich Doering: Die gelehrten Theologen Deutschlands im achtzehnten und neunzehnten Jahrhundert. Verlag Johann Karl Gottfried Wagner, Neustadt an der Orla 1835, Bd. 4, S. 654, (Online)
 Wilhelm Heinen: Die Anthropologie in der Sittenlehre Ferdinand Geminian Wankers (1758-1824). Albert, Freiburg im Breisgau 1955
 Ernst Münch: Ferdinand Wanker, Professor der Moral und designierter Erzbischof von Freiburg. In: Ders.: Biographisch-historische Studien. Hallberger, Stuttgart 1836, Bd. 2, S. 267–312 (Digitalisat)
 Hans J. Münk: Der Freiburger Moraltheologe Ferdinand Geminian Wanker (1758–1825) und Immanuel Kant: Historisch-vergleichende Studie unter Berücksichtigung weiteren philosophisch-theologischen Gedankenguts der Spätaufklärung. Patmos, Düsseldorf 2006 (online, PDF-Datei)
  
 Friedrich August Schmidt: Neuer Nekrolog der Deutschen. Bernhard Friedrich Voigt, Ilmenau 1826, 2. Jg., 1824, 1. Heft, S. 168 (Online)

References

1758 births
1824 deaths
German Roman Catholic theologians
Clergy from Freiburg im Breisgau
German ethicists
German philosophers